Dan Owen Dailey (born 1947) is an American artist and educator, known for his sculpture. With the support of a team of artists and crafts people, he creates sculptures and functional objects in glass and metal. He has taught at many glass programs and is professor emeritus at the Massachusetts College of Art, where he founded the glass program.

Emerging from the studio glass movement initiated by Harvey Littleton, Dailey's work has branched out from the mainstream by the incorporation of metal into many of the sculptures. Additionally, he has worked with several glass companies, for more than twenty years. Since 1971, Dailey's work has been featured in more than 150 exhibitions and included in over 350 juried or invitational group shows.

Early life and education
Dan Dailey was born on February 4, 1947, in Philadelphia, Pennsylvania. 

Daily attended the Philadelphia College of Art (now called the University of the Arts, BFA 1969) and Rhode Island School of Design (MFA 1972). Dailey studied with Dale Chihuly at RISD, and was Chihuly’s first graduate student. In 1972 to 1973, he was awarded the Fulbright Fellowship to study glass at the Venini Factory in Murano, Italy.

He is married to Linda MacNeil, an artist also working with glass and metal, primarily in the studio or art jewelry field.

Career

1970s 

Dailey worked at Massachusetts College of Art and Design, Boston from 1973 until 1985; where he was the founder of the glass department. Additionally he taught in 1975 at Pilchuck Glass School in Stanwood, Washington. In the 1970s, Dailey continued to create illuminated sculpture and vase forms, and began to develop Vitrolite wall reliefs.

In 1975, Dailey received a fellowship at the Massachusetts Institute of Technology's Center for Advanced Visual Studies in Cambridge where he co-taught the class Glass, Gas and Electricity with German artist Otto Piene. This experimental sculpture class emphasized and explored the phenomenon of illumination. In conjunction with the MIT Research Lab for Electronics, Dailey further studied the qualities of light and glass.

From in 1978 to 2003, Dailey created 7 editions of pâte de verre works with Cristallerie Daum, a French decorative glass studio. Dailey's editions of work with studio Daum include, Les Danseurs, Le Vent, Le Joyeau, L’Eau, Le Vin, Le Soleil, and La Dame.

In 1979, he received a National Endowment for the Arts Fellowship–Glass award.

1980s
During 1980, Dailey was awarded the Massachusetts Council on the Arts Fellowship–Glass. 

From 1984 until 1985, he worked as an independent designer and artist with Steuben Glass Works in Corning, New York. At the request of Steuben, Dailey produced sports-themed designs to be produced on vases, with one design, Ice Dancers, being produced. 

Additionally from 1984 to 1985, he worked as an independent designer and artist at Fenton Art Glass Company, in Williamstown, West Virginia. Together with Fenton Art Glass Company, Dailey worked on producing cast glass components of a low-relief mural. With numerous assistants, Dailey also blew glass to create various works, notably, the mural Science Fiction Series (created 1985 to 1986).

1987 Commission: Orbit, Rockefeller Center, New York City
In 1987 Henry Geldzahler, Milton Glaser, and Hugh Hardy selected Dailey to make a cast glass relief mural titled Orbit, for the Rainbow Room at the Rockefeller Center. In 2018 Orbit was removed and donated to the Toledo Museum of Art. Dailey also created wall sconces for various locations around the Rainbow Room complex. These works were later removed and their location is unknown.

1987 Solo exhibition: Renwick Gallery, Smithsonian Institution, Washington, D.C.
Henry Geldzahler wrote an essay for the catalog, in which he noted, "Dan Dailey's achievement is in the seamless marriage he effects in his work in every medium between the idiosyncratic convolutions of his inner landscape and the classic harmony and lucidity of the great tradition in glass, of whom Daum, Nancy and Lalique are giants. Dailey's work joins in that tradition, but with a contemporary spin that causes the viewer to smile in complicity."

1987 Retrospective exhibition of Dan Dailey’s work at the University of the Arts (Philadelphia), Rosenwald Wolf Gallery
The exhibition, curated by Eleni Cocordas, consisted of fifty works, including illuminated sculpture, Vitrolite wall reliefs, vases, and pastel drawings.

1989 Masters Fellowship, Creative Glass Center of America

1990s
1993 collections: Musée des Arts Décoratifs, Louvre, Paris
Dailey work titled The Doctor from 1988 is accepted into their permanent collection.

1994 commission: Boca Palms
26 special edition vases commissioned by the Boca Raton Museum of Art, Florida.

1998 Invited Artist: Waterford Crystal in Ireland
Dailey was invited to work as an independent artist by Waterford Crystal, Kilbarry, Ireland, in 1998. Dailey visited three times between 1998-1999 to create chandeliers, wall sconces, and seven engraved vases, using particular processes unique to the history and specialty of Waterford Crystal.

1998 awards
Fellow of the American Craft Council, ACC College of Fellows
Outstanding Achievement in Glass, UrbanGlass
Honorary Lifetime Membership Award, Glass Arts Society

2000s 
2000 Libensky Award, Chateau Ste. Michelle Vineyards & Winery
2001 awards
President's Distinguished Artist Award, University of the Arts, Philadelphia
Masters of the Medium Award, James Renwick Alliance
Art of Liberty Award, National Liberty Museum, Philadelphia
2004 commission: Tribute Chandelier, Providence Performing Arts Center, Rhode Island
2007 publication: Glassigator, written and illustrated by Dan Dailey and Allison MacNeil Dailey in conjunction with the Toledo Museum of Art

The Toledo Museum of Art, a museum whose major focus is on glass, asked Dailey to create a children's book explaining and illustrating the process of glassblowing. Dailey collaborated with Allison Dailey, who developed the characters and executed all of the final watercolor drawings for the book. The book is based on the making of a particular vase titled Alligator, from Dailey's Animal Vase series begun in 1992.

2007 publication: Dan Dailey, a 384-page volume on Dailey's work, published by Harry N. Abrams.

The book, a comprehensive view of Dailey's work from 1968 to 2007, includes 460 illustrations and 400 full-color images, and was designed and edited by Joe Rapone. Writing and essays are by Milton Glaser, Tina Oldknow, and William Warmus.

2007 Silver Star Alumni Award, College of Art and Design at the University of the Arts (Philadelphia)
2008-09 Residency:  G.A.P.P Glass Residency (Guest Artist Pavilion Project) Toledo Museum of Art, Toledo, Ohio

Dailey was asked to be a part of the G.A.P.P. The focus of the residency was to study and respond to the museum's collection, with a focus on landscape and paintings. Dailey's glass mural project for the museum was begun in 2008 and is now in progress.

2009–Present: Materialism lecture series, Massachusetts College of Art and Design, Boston

Dailey conducted a series of artist interviews, in collaboration with Joe Rapone, which explore the notion of "Materialism", a term that includes a rethinking of movements of the 1970s, specifically the Studio Craft Movement.

2010 and onward 
2010 Guest Artist Pavilion Project - Artist Residency, Toledo Museum of Art, Toledo, OH
2012 Exhibition Dan Dailey: Working Method, Fuller Craft Museum, Brockton, Massachusetts
Dailey named Professor Emeritus at Massachusetts College of Art and Design, Boston, MA
2013 Visiting Artist Fellowship, Museum of Glass, Tacoma, WA
2014 Exhibition Dan Dailey: Illuminated Works 7, World Trade Center, New York
2014 Exhibition Dan Dailey: Working Method, Fuller Craft Museum, Brockton, MA, 19 works
2014 Publication Dan Dailey: Visions Realized, Fuller Craft Museum, Brockton, MA, 56 pp
Distinguished Educator Award, Renwick Gallery of the Smithsonian American Art Museum
Lifetime Achievement Award, Glass Art Society
2019 Exhibition Dan Dailey: Character SketchChrysler Museum of Art Norfolk, VA 39 works
2019 Publication Dan Dailey: Character Sketch Chrysler Museum of Art Norfolk, VA 50 pp

Public museum collections

United States

Europe

Other locations

Gallery

References

1947 births
Living people
Artists from Philadelphia
American glass artists
Rhode Island School of Design faculty
Massachusetts College of Art and Design faculty
Sculptors from Pennsylvania
University of the Arts (Philadelphia) alumni
Rhode Island School of Design alumni